This article is an episode list for the French animated series Oggy and the Cockroaches. As of November 2021, "The Magic Pen" ("Crayon Magique") is the most-viewed episode on YouTube with over 158 Million views.

Series overview

Episode list

Season 1 (1998–1999)

Season 2 (2000–03)

Season 3 (2008; 2017–2018)

Season 4 (2012–13)

Season 5 (2017–18)

Season 6 (2017–18)

Season 7 (2018–19)

Notes

References

External links

Lists of French television series episodes